Clare Dunne or Dunn may refer to:
 Clare Dunne (Irish actress)
 Clare Dunn, American country musician
 Claire Dunne (born 1937), Irish-born Australian actress